This is a full list of all Brazilian medalists at the Pan American Games.

List of medalists

Notes

Stripped medals

Multiple medalists

Total medals

Athletes with or more than eight medals conquered:

Most gold medals

Athletes with four or more gold medals won:

More than one sport

Athletes who won medals in more than one type of sport:

See also

List of Olympic medalists for Brazil
Brazil at the Pan American Games

References

Pan American Games medalists for Brazil